Meymunabad (also Romanized as Meymūnābād; also known as Mehmānābād and Moḩammadābād) is a village in Sis Rural District, Bolbanabad District, Dehgolan County, Kurdistan Province, Iran. At the 2006 census, its population was 122, in 28 families. The village is populated by Kurds.

References 

Towns and villages in Dehgolan County
Kurdish settlements in Kurdistan Province